Mimi is a locality in northern Taranaki, in the North Island of New Zealand. It is located on State Highway 3 close to the shore of the North Taranaki Bight, 6 kilometres north-east of Urenui and 26 km south-west of Ahititi. The Mimi River flows past the settlement into the North Taranaki Bight.

Marae

Pukearuhe Marae is located on the Mimi coast. It features the Tama Ariki meeting house, and is affiliated with the tribe of Ngāti Tama.

In October 2020, the Government committed $103,310 from the Provincial Growth Fund to upgrade the marae, creating an estimated 25 jobs.

Education
Mimi School is a coeducational contributing primary (years 1–6) school with a decile rating of 4 and a roll of 27.

Notes

External links
 Mimi School website

New Plymouth District
Populated places in Taranaki